Boogie Superstar is a rhythm video game by Electronic Arts. It is the sequel to the game Boogie.

NGamer magazine initially reported that the title would support the Wii Balance Board, writing that it was to be a "board-based dance-a-thon"; however, Electronic Arts confirmed that while the title would include a microphone to sing along to, it will not support the Wii Balance Board.

Gameplay
Like the original game, Boogie Superstar features both singing and dancing. The game is based around the premise of a talent contest.

The karaoke gameplay is similar to other singing games such as SingStar and Karaoke Revolution. To score, the player must sing in time and in tune with the lyrics as they scroll at the bottom of the screen, with a musical staff to indicate the correct pitch and where the player's current pitch is.  Rather than using phonetic detection, the game bases the score on how well the player matches the rhythm and pitch.

In contrast to the freestyle dancing in the last game, the game mechanic in Boogie Superstar involves players waggling the Wii Remote to simple two-beat prompts, such as swinging the Remote side-to side or up and down in time to on screen directions.

Track listing 

Boogie Superstar features over 40 songs, all cover versions. Some songs are only playable in either the singing or dancing part of the game. The song list includes the following:

Angel, Love Like This, Pocketful of Sunshine - Natasha Bedingfield
Dance Like There's No Tomorrow - Paula Abdul
Bullseye, Like Whoa, Potential Breakup Song - Aly and AJ
The Great Escape - Boys Like Girls
Everytime We Touch, What Hurts the Most- Cascada
Fancy Footwork - Chromeo
Thnks fr th Mmrs, Dance, Dance (Best Buy exclusive) - Fall Out Boy
Glamorous - Fergie
Elevator - Flo Rida feat. Timbaland
I Don't Want to Be in Love (Dance Floor Anthem) - Good Charlotte
Wake Up - Hilary Duff
Hold On, SOS, That's Just the Way We Roll, When You Look Me in the Eyes - The Jonas Brothers
No One - Alicia Keys
Take You There - Sean Kingston
Girlfriend - Avril Lavigne
Bleeding Love - Leona Lewis
Shake It- Metro Station
What You Got - Colby O'Donis
I Don't Think About It - Emily Osment
Nine in the Afternoon - Panic! at the Disco
Hot n Cold - Katy Perry
The Ketchup Song - Las Ketchup 
Jump to the Rhythm - Jordan Pruitt
Don't Stop the Music, Shut Up and Drive - Rihanna
Yahhh! - Soulja Boy Tellem
Radar, Toxic, Piece of Me (GameStop exclusive)- Britney Spears
He Said She Said - Ashley Tisdale
Makes Me Wonder, Won't Go Home Without You (Target exclusive) - Maroon 5
Stronger - Kanye West
Ching-a-Ling - Missy Elliott

Notes

Reception
Boogie Superstar received mixed reviews, with a Metacritic average of 67%.

The Official Nintendo Magazine in the UK was impressed with the game, and in a review in the Christmas 2008 edition, said that it "does what it does very well indeed." IGN was less enamoured, concluding that Boogie Superstar was "a decent dancing game, paired with an awful karaoke game."

References

2008 video games
Dance video games
Karaoke video games
Music video games
Video games developed in Canada
Video game sequels
Wii-only games
Wii games
Multiplayer and single-player video games